Arthur A. Brooks (1906–1982) was an American film editor. He worked in Hollywood for a variety of independent companies.

Selected filmography

 Code of the West (1929)
 The Last Round-Up (1929)
 The Phantom Rider (1929)
 Pioneers of the West (1929)
 The Oklahoma Kid (1929)
 The Lone Horseman (1929)
 Under Texas Skies (1930)
 Breezy Bill (1930)
Call of the Desert (1930)
 The Canyon of Missing Men (1930)
 Beyond the Law (1930)
 Code of Honor (1930)
 Primrose Path (1931)
 Wild West Whoopee (1931)
  A Story of the South Seas (1931)
 Secret Menace (1931)
 The Man from Death Valley (1931)
 Lawless Valley (1932)
 The Pecos Kid (1935)
 Roaring Roads (1935)
 Rustler's Paradise (1935)
 Adventurous Knights (1935)
 Toll of the Desert (1935)
 The Last of the Clintons (1935)
 Social Error (1935)
 Wagon Trail (1935)
 Wild Mustang (1935)
 The Ghost Rider (1935)
 Suicide Squad (1935)
 Aces Wild (1936)
 Doughnuts and Society (1936)
 Fury Below (1936)
 Wildcat Saunders (1936)
 Ghost Town (1936)
 Cavalcade of the West (1936)
 Hair-Trigger Casey (1936)
 Romance Rides the Range (1936)
  Desert Justice (1936)
 Gun Grit (1936)
 The Fighting Deputy (1937)
 Melody of the Plains (1937)
 Moonlight on the Range (1937)
 Dark Manhattan (1937)
 The Roaming Cowboy (1937)
 The Singing Buckaroo (1937)
 Heroes of the Alamo (1937)
 Songs and Saddles (1938)
 The Duke Is Tops (1938)
 Rolling Home (1946)
 Renegade Girl (1946)
 The Hat Box Mystery (1947)
 Shoot to Kill (1947)
 An Old-Fashioned Girl (1949)
 Shamrock Hill (1949)

References

Bibliography
 Pitts, Michael R. Poverty Row Studios, 1929–1940: An Illustrated History of 55 Independent Film Companies, with a Filmography for Each. McFarland & Company, 2005.

External links

1906 births
1982 deaths
American film editors
People from Dayton, Ohio